{{DISPLAYTITLE:C11H14N4O4}}
The molecular formula C11H14N4O4 (molar mass: 266.253 g/mol, exact mass: 266.1015 u) may refer to:

 Doxofylline
 Forodesine

Molecular formulas